Fallowfield station could refer to:

 Fallowfield station (Ontario), a railway and bus rapid transit station in Ottawa, Ontario
 Fallowfield station (PAAC), a light rail station in Pittsburgh, Pennsylvania
 Fallowfield railway station, a disused railway station in Manchester, England